Enterprise Dynamics is a discrete event simulation software platform developed by INCONTROL Simulation Solutions. It is used to design and implement simulation solutions. The Enterprise Dynamics (ED) platform has several market-specific libraries to conform to customer requirements. These libraries are:
 ED Logistics
 ED Airport
 ED Transport
 ED Warehouse
 PD Pedestrian Dynamics
 ED Educational
 Showflow

History 
Enterprise Dynamics is based on the Taylor II simulation software, which was developed by F&H Simulations. In 1998, the newly developed simulation platform Taylor Enterprise Dynamics was introduced and in 2000, F&H Simulations was acquired by the consulting company and simulation software distributor Incontrol Business Engineers. The new company name became INCONTROL Simulation Solutions and Taylor ED was renamed to Enterprise Dynamics. At this time F&H Simulations, now called Flexsim Software Products, became independent and developed a new simulation software called Flexsim.

Fields of application 
Enterprise Dynamics has been applied or is currently being applied in the following fields:
 Automotive
 Electronics
 Manufacturing & Production
 Material Handling
 Supply Chain Management
 Logistics & Distribution
 Airports
 Harbors
 Rail transport
 Healthcare
 Contact Centers
 Banking & Finance
 Sports & Events
 Public & Service
 Educational

Architecture 
Enterprise Dynamics is an object-oriented simulation platform combined with an event-oriented approach. The user can select standard simulation objects (the so-called 'Atoms'), in which the behavior of their real life equivalents is captured, from a library and create a model by clicking and dragging the objects into the model space. For each simulation object, parameters can be altered to change its behavior.

Version history

Add-ons
Several add-ons are available that will extent the functionality of ED. These add-ons are:
 CAD Import Wizard
 DLL Kit
 Emulation - OPC
 Multicrane - Controller
 Security Kit
 OptQuest

References

External links 
 incontrolsim.com | Company & product
 Enterprise Dynamics educational portal

Computational science
Events (computing)
Mathematical optimization in business
Simulation software
Virtual reality